Eman Al-Ghamidi is a Saudi politician. In September 2017, she was appointed as "assistant mayor of Al Khubar governorate", making her the most senior female politician in Saudi Arabia.

References

21st-century Saudi Arabian politicians
21st-century Saudi Arabian women politicians
Living people
Year of birth missing (living people)